Mark Monaghan is an Australian politician who serves as MP for the Australian Labor Party in the Northern Territory Legislative Assembly for the electoral division of Fong Lim as of 2020. He is currently the 14th Speaker of the Northern Territory Legislative Assembly after being elected on 23 May 2022 following the appointment of the previous Speaker Ngaree Ah Kit to cabinet.

Pre-politics
Monaghan worked as a teacher prior to entering politics and has lived in the Northern Territory for over 20 years. He met his wife Michelle while working there and together they have three children. After teaching, Monaghan was attached to various roles, including being the General Manager of Engineers Australia.

Politics

|}
Monaghan was selected for Labor to contest the marginal seat of Fong Lim in the 2020 Northern Territory general election to replace Jeff Collins who resigned from the party in 2019 and contested the seat with the Territory Alliance party. As of August 25, 2020, Monaghan is set to be the next member for the seat.

References 

Living people
Members of the Northern Territory Legislative Assembly
Australian Labor Party members of the Northern Territory Legislative Assembly
University of Tasmania alumni
21st-century Australian politicians
Year of birth missing (living people)
Place of birth missing (living people)